Huntsville City FC is an American professional soccer team that is located in Huntsville, Alabama. It is the reserve team of Nashville SC and will participate in MLS Next Pro.  The team will play its games at Joe Davis Stadium.

History 
On July 12, 2022, Nashville SC announced that it would start an MLS Next Pro team based in Huntsville, Alabama. On August 4, 2022, Huntsville was named as one of seven MLS-affiliated clubs that would field teams in the MLS Next Pro league beginning in the 2023 season.The team name and logo was announced on November 9, 2022. Huntsville City will be the only MLS reserve side that plays outside its parent team's home market.

On December 19, 2022, midfielder Isaiah Johnston from York United was announced as the club's first official signing. Transfer details were not disclosed.

Players and staff

Roster

Staff

See also 
 MLS Next Pro

References

External links 
 

Association football clubs established in 2022
2022 establishments in Alabama
Nashville SC
Soccer clubs in Alabama
Reserve soccer teams in the United States
MLS Next Pro teams